Alain Sars (born 30 April 1961) is a retired French football referee.

Sars has officiated matches in the 2000 African Cup of Nations, UEFA Champions League, the UEFA European Football Championship, and the 1995 FIFA World Youth Championship. He also served as a referee in qualifying matches for the Euro 1996, 1998 World Cup, Euro 2000, 2002 World Cup, Euro 2004, and 2006 World Cup tournaments.

Alin Sars became infamous in Sweden in the Champions League game between AIK vs. Barcelona in the year 1999. AIK took a surprising lead by Nebojša Novaković when there were 20 minutes left of the game. In the 85th minute Sars decided to allow Barcelona to commence with their corner kick during a double substitution for AIK, resulting in a goal. AIK lost the game 1-2 after a late goal in extra time from Barcelona. The Swedes were furious and the Head Coach of AIK Stuart Baxter was sent off after heavily protesting the unjust goal. Even to this day Sars is an unpopular referee among AIK-fans.

The AIK-Barcelona game wasn't the first game in which he made a huge scandal. In a game between PSV Eindhoven and Kauserlautern he allowed a goal when the ball wasn't over the line thanks to player protests.

After these scandals Sars was appointed as a referee in a FIFA world cup.

Sars was named by FIFA in March 2006 as one of the 44 candidate referees to officiate at the 2006 FIFA World Cup in Germany, but he was not among those selected for the tournament. He retired internationally in 2006.

References

External links
Game Northern Ireland – Ukraine as part of World Cup 1998
 
 
 

1961 births
Living people
French football referees